Brizuela is a family name that has Spanish origin. It takes its name from the so-called village, near Villarcayo (Burgos). They founded houses in the place of San Martín de Olías, in the town of Medina de Pomar, in the town of Valmayor de Cuesta Uría and in the valley of Aedo, all in the aforementioned province. Other lines of this lineage were extending through the provinces of Segovia, Palencia, León and Soria. Also a branch settled in the Valencian region. Members of this lineage carried out tests of nobility and cleanliness of blood to enter the various military orders, preferably those of Santiago, Montesa and Alcántara.

Famous persons with the surname of Brizuela:

Barbara M. Brizuela, Professor of Education at Tufts University
Braulio Brizuela (born 1988), Paraguayan footballer
Daniel Brizuela (born 1985), male featherweight boxer from Argentina
Eduardo Brizuela del Moral (born 1944), Argentine Radical Civic Union (UCR) politician
Gabriel Brizuela (born 1979), Argentine professional racing cyclist
Hugo Brizuela (born 1969), former Paraguayan football striker
Isaác Brizuela (born 1990), Mexican footballer
Nelson Brizuela (born 1950), football coach
Brizuela, Cacique of Baitiquirí, Cuba
Leopoldo Brizuela, writer and translator

See also
Atemajac de Brizuela, small town in the southeast sierra of Jalisco, Mexico, 64 km southwest of Guadalajara